The 1991 Murcian regional election was held on Sunday, 26 May 1991, to elect the 3rd Regional Assembly of the autonomous community of the Region of Murcia. All 45 seats in the Regional Assembly were up for election. The election was held simultaneously with regional elections in twelve other autonomous communities and local elections all throughout Spain.

The Spanish Socialist Workers' Party (PSOE) under president Carlos Collado won an absolute majority of seats for a third consecutive term in office, as the overall political landscape of the Region remained relatively unchanged. The Democratic and Social Centre (CDS) lost all three of its seats, which were re-distributed among the newly founded People's Party (PP) and the left-wing United Left (IU). The results allowed Collado to be elected as the head of a majority government until April 1993, when he was brought down by his own party and replaced by María Antonia Martínez.

This would be the last regional election victory for the PSOE until 2019, as well as the last time to date that the party accessed the regional government.

Overview

Electoral system
The Regional Assembly of Murcia was the devolved, unicameral legislature of the autonomous community of Murcia, having legislative power in regional matters as defined by the Spanish Constitution and the Murcian Statute of Autonomy, as well as the ability to vote confidence in or withdraw it from a regional president.

Voting for the Regional Assembly was on the basis of universal suffrage, which comprised all nationals over 18 years of age, registered in the Region of Murcia and in full enjoyment of their political rights. The 45 members of the Regional Assembly of Murcia were elected using the D'Hondt method and a closed list proportional representation, with an electoral threshold of five percent of valid votes—which included blank ballots—being applied regionally. Seats were allocated to constituencies, which were established by law as follows:

District One 
District Two 
District Three 
District Four 
District Five 

Each constituency was entitled to an initial minimum of one seat, with the remaining 40 allocated among the constituencies in proportion to their populations.

Election date
The term of the Regional Assembly of Murcia expired four years after the date of its previous election. Legal amendments earlier in 1991 established that elections to the Regional Assembly were to be fixed for the fourth Sunday of May every four years. The previous election was held on 10 June 1987, setting the election date for the Regional Assembly on Sunday, 26 May 1991.

The Regional Assembly of Murcia could not be dissolved before the date of expiry of parliament except in the event of an investiture process failing to elect a regional president within a two-month period from the first ballot. In such a case, the Regional Assembly was to be automatically dissolved and a snap election called, with elected deputies merely serving out what remained of their four-year terms.

Parties and candidates
The electoral law allowed for parties and federations registered in the interior ministry, coalitions and groupings of electors to present lists of candidates. Parties and federations intending to form a coalition ahead of an election were required to inform the relevant Electoral Commission within ten days of the election call, whereas groupings of electors needed to secure the signature of at least one percent of the electorate in the Region of Murcia, disallowing electors from signing for more than one list of candidates.

Below is a list of the main parties and electoral alliances which contested the election:

Opinion polls
The table below lists voting intention estimates in reverse chronological order, showing the most recent first and using the dates when the survey fieldwork was done, as opposed to the date of publication. Where the fieldwork dates are unknown, the date of publication is given instead. The highest percentage figure in each polling survey is displayed with its background shaded in the leading party's colour. If a tie ensues, this is applied to the figures with the highest percentages. The "Lead" column on the right shows the percentage-point difference between the parties with the highest percentages in a poll. When available, seat projections determined by the polling organisations are displayed below (or in place of) the percentages in a smaller font; 23 seats were required for an absolute majority in the Regional Assembly of Murcia.

Results

Overall

Distribution by constituency

Aftermath

Government formation

1993 crisis
The position of the regional president Carlos Collado weakened after the publication of a report from the Court of Auditors recording anomalies in the accounting of the autonomous community throughout 1989; specially the purchase, for an exorbitant price—2 billion Pta compared to its market value of 500 million Pta, a surplus of 1.5 billion—of the Casa Grande estate (Spanish for "Big House") that the community subsequently gave, free of charge, to the General Electric multinational to help its establishment in the Region. The opposition parties PP and IU accused Collado of corruption crimes including embezzlement of public funds, prevarication and bribery, and in February 1993 most of the Socialist Group in the Regional Assembly (22 out of 24 deputies) sent a document to the party's regional executive signalling their loss of confidence in Collado, blaming him for the deterioration of regional governance. The PSOE-controlled Economic Commission of the Regional Assembly sent all documentation on the purchase of the Casa Grande estate to the High Court of Justice of Murcia after appreciating signs of embezzlement and prevarication in Collado's actions.

The PP filled a motion of no confidence on Collado because of "the lack of political and social trust of Collado's government, the ungovernability of the Region and the paralysis of the Administration". The motion was rejected by the absolute majority of the Regional Assembly, which the PSOE commanded. While Collado denied any wrongdoing and rejected a resignation, his party refused to explicitly support his management.

The political crisis in the Region escalated by mid-April 1993 after several PSOE members publicly demanded Collado's resignation, with the regional executive considering filling a motion of no confidence on their own president if he kept refusing to stand down. Carlos Collado announced his resignation on 15 April, formalized on 19 April, in order to end the ongoing crisis, being replaced in the post by María Antonia Martínez, who subsequently became the first woman in presiding over a Spanish autonomous community. In 1997, Collado would be acquitted of all charges against him in the Casa Grande scandal that forced his resignation.

The motives behind the political crisis in the Region were later attributed to the ongoing clash between the two main factions in the PSOE: the guerristas—supporters of Alfonso Guerra, advocating for a strong party organization, and an ideology with more rhetorical, historical and trade union appeals—and the renovadores—centered around Felipe González, aiming for a more pragmatic, social democratic ideology and a more flexible organizational vision. The then regional executive of the PSOE, controlled by the guerristas since 1990, was said to have lost confidence in Collado and to have sought his downfall by putting him in the spotlight of judicial and parliamentary investigations, then having him replaced by the guerrista María Antonia Martínez.

Notes

References
Opinion poll sources

Other

1991 in Murcia (region)
Murcia
Regional elections in the Region of Murcia
May 1991 events in Europe